Sir Andrew Davidson (1892–1962) was an academic, footballer, public health official, royal physician and soldier.  He was knighted in 1946.

There are five photographic portraits by Walter Stoneman in the National Portrait Gallery.

References

20th-century Scottish medical doctors
Academics of the University of Glasgow
Alumni of the University of Glasgow
Celtic F.C. players
Chief Medical Officers for Scotland
Court physicians
People from Clydebank
Royal Army Medical Corps officers
Scottish knights
St Mirren F.C. wartime guest players
British Army personnel of World War I
Scottish footballers
Association football wing halves